Quesnelia liboniana is a species of flowering plant in the family Bromeliaceae, endemic to southeastern Brazil. It was first described in 1851 as Billbergia liboniana. It is found in the Atlantic Forest ecoregion of southeastern Brazil.

See also

References

External links 

liboniana
Endemic flora of Brazil
Flora of the Atlantic Forest
Flora of Minas Gerais
Flora of Rio de Janeiro (state)
Flora of São Paulo (state)
Garden plants of South America
Plants described in 1851